"Cuts You Up" is a song by English musician Peter Murphy, released in 1990 as the second single from his third solo studio album, Deep (1989). The song became Murphy's most successful release, topping the US Billboard Modern Rock Tracks chart and appearing on the Billboard Hot 100 and Billboard Album Rock Tracks charts.

The live versions of the song appear on the B-side of "You're So Close" (1992) single and Alive Just for Love live album, released in 2001.

Background and recording
"Cuts You Up" features a melodic violin line over a bed of acoustic guitars, keyboards, percussion, and bass guitar. Peter Murphy described the song as "having a very driving, acoustic quality to it and lots of sort of hooky, melodic overtones to it with a not-so-straight lyric." Producer Simon Rogers stated that "Murphy brought the song to the sessions in more-or-less its final form," describing it as "pretty much exactly like the demo."

Murphy also visualized the violin part that runs through the performance and used a sample. Rogers recruited a viola player to play the line. Nevertheless, he was not satisfied with the live recording of the strings, stating that "it didn't have the atmosphere and was too moody." The sample was eventually retained for the finished release.

Reception

Commercial
"Cuts You Up" was the second single from the record. It became a modern rock hit in United States in 1990, spending seven weeks at the top of the Billboard Modern Rock Tracks chart. It also charted on Billboard Hot 100 and the Billboard Album Rock Tracks chart, peaking at number 55 and number 10 respectively. The single sold over 250,000 copies in three weeks in the US. Following its success, Deep reached number 44 on the Billboard 200 album chart. "Cuts You Up" also charted in Canada, peaking at number 41 on the RPM Top Singles chart, and in Australia, where it reached number 96 on the ARIA Singles Chart.

Acclaim
Ned Raggett of AllMusic described the song as "a love song with solid energy and an inspired vocal" and "a perfect calling card for the album as a whole." Allmusic staff editor Stephen Thomas Erlewine also labeled the song as "Bowie-esque."

Annie Zaleski of Billboard.com described the song as "striking and mysterious" and "Lyrically, the song is poetic and elliptical, with vague references to something profoundly transformative that provokes soul-searching."

The track was listed as number nine on Billboard's Greatest of All Time Alternative Songs chart.

The track was also featured as number 40 on PopMatters' "The 100 Greatest Alternative Singles of the ‘80s" list.

Track listing

Personnel
 Peter Murphy – vocals, lyrics, mixing, design, samples

The Hundred Men
 Terl Bryant – drums, percussion
 Eddie Branch – bass
 Paul Statham – guitar, keyboards
 Peter Bonas – guitar

Technical personnel
 Simon Rogers – production, acoustic guitar; mixing (2-4)
 Ian Grimble – engineering
 Steve Rooke – mastering
 Alastair Johnson – recording
 Roland Herrington – recording
 Nick Rogers – mixing (1)

Charts

References

See also
Number one modern rock hits of 1990

1989 songs
1990 singles
Beggars Banquet Records singles
Peter Murphy (musician) songs
Songs written by Paul Statham